Vĩnh Xương is a rural commune (xã) and village of the Tân Châu District of An Giang Province, Vietnam.

International border gate 
Vĩnh Xương is the location of an international border crossing with Cambodia, with the official name Sông Tiền. Its counterpart across the border is Khaorm Sam Nor Kaoh Roka border gate, Kandal Province, Cambodia. Besides conventional Vietnamese visas, this border crossing is also listed as a Vietnamese Evisa entry point for foreigners.

Gallery

References

Communes of An Giang province
Populated places in An Giang province
Cambodia–Vietnam border crossings